Henry Stephen Gorham FRES(1839–1920) was an English entomologist who specialised in Coleoptera.

He was a Fellow of the Royal Entomological Society from 1885, a Fellow of the Zoological Society of London from 1881; and a Member of the Societé Entomologique de France from 1887.

He wrote very many short scientific papers and in Biologia Centrali-Americana. Insecta. Coleoptera. Vol. VII. Erotylidae, Endomychidae, and Coccinellidae. VII. London. 276 pp., 13plates. 1887-1899 edited by Osbert Salvin and Frederick DuCane Godman.

References
Anon., 1920 Ent. News 31:210
Tomlin, J. R. le B Entomologist’s monthly Magazine 56:112-113.

External links

Coleopterist Long entry in the Biographical Dictionary
DEI biografi Collection details
UGA Papers on Ennomychidae
SIL Digital version of Biologia Centrali-Americana

English coleopterists
Fellows of the Royal Entomological Society
1839 births
1920 deaths